Day of the Viper is a first-person adventure video game published by Accolade in 1989.  As the Viper robot, the player must explore five abandoned hi-tech and heavily guarded buildings in order to find and install floppy disks.

Reception
The game was reviewed in 1990 in Dragon #157 by Hartley, Patricia, and Kirk Lesser in "The Role of Computers" column. The reviewers gave the game 5 out of 5 stars.

Reviews
ST Format - (Jan, 1990)
Atari ST User - (Apr, 1990)
Zzap! - (Apr, 1990)
The Games Machine - (Apr, 1990)
ASM (Aktueller Software Markt) - (Jan, 1990)
ACE (Advanced Computer Entertainment) - (May, 1990)
ACE (Advanced Computer Entertainment) - (Nov, 1989)

References

External links

1989 video games
Accolade (company) games
Amiga games
Atari ST games
DOS games
First-person shooters
Video games developed in the United States